Zoumana Simpara (born 2 February 1998) is a Malian footballer who plays as a midfielder.

Career

Club career
Simpara was a member of AS Korofina and AS Bakaridjan in the Malian Première Division. While with AS Bakaridjan in 2016, Simpara made two appearances for the club in the CAF Confederation Cup against Tunisian club Stade Gabèsien.

On 16 April 2016, Simpara signed with American third division side and New York Red Bulls affiliate club, New York Red Bulls II in the United Soccer League. The following day, Simpara made his debut for the club as a second half substitute in a scoreless draw against the Rochester Rhinos. On 2 August 2016 Simpara scored his first goal for New York in a 5-0 rout over Harrisburg City Islanders. On 12 August  Simpara scored his second goal of the season for New York in a 5-1 victory over Orlando City B.

Simpara was released by Red Bulls II in November 2016.

International career
During the 2015 FIFA U-17 World Cup Simpara made two appearances for Mali against Belgium and Honduras.

Career statistics

Honors

Club
New York Red Bulls II
USL Cup (1): 2016

References

External links

1998 births
Living people
Malian footballers
New York Red Bulls II players
Association football midfielders
USL Championship players
Mali A' international footballers
2020 African Nations Championship players
Malian expatriate sportspeople in the United States
Expatriate soccer players in the United States
Malian expatriate footballers